Martha Marguerite Bullock ( Eccles, September 17, 1849 – March 10, 1939) was an American pioneer woman who was the wife of Seth Bullock, one of the leading citizens in early Deadwood, South Dakota. She and Bullock were married in Salt Lake City, Utah, in 1874.

Martha Bullock and daughter Margaret were sent to live with her parents in Michigan in 1876 when Seth Bullock first left for Deadwood, then a wild lawless frontier town and no place for a family; after the town had become more orderly, largely as a result of the efforts of Bullock himself as sheriff, they joined her husband in Deadwood. She became a leading member of local society and excellently managed their household. They subsequently had another daughter, Florence, and a son, Stanley.

In popular culture

Martha Bullock appeared as a supporting character in the HBO television series Deadwood and Deadwood: The Movie where she was portrayed by Anna Gunn. Several creative liberties were taken with the facts surrounding the real Martha Bullock for the show's character.  Unlike her character in the TV series, she was not originally the widow of Bullock's brother, but is reported to have been his childhood sweetheart ; and similarly, rather than having a son by Bullock's brother, she and Bullock actually had a daughter, Margaret, at the time of Bullock's departure for Deadwood.

References

1851 births
1939 deaths
People of the American Old West
People from Deadwood, South Dakota